The sixth cholera pandemic (1899–1923) was a major outbreak of cholera beginning in India, where it killed more than 800,000 people, and spreading to the Middle East, North Africa, Eastern Europe, and Russia.

History
According to Leonard Rogers, following an outbreak of cholera at the Haridwar Kumbh Mela, the epidemic spread to Europe via Punjab, Afghanistan, Persia, and southern Russia.

The last cholera outbreak in the United States was in 1910–1911 when the steamship Moltke brought infected people to New York City from Naples. Vigilant health authorities isolated the infected on Swinburne Island, built in the nineteenth century as a quarantine facility. Eleven people died, including a health care worker at the island hospital.

In 1913, the Romanian Army, while invading Bulgaria during the Second Balkan War, suffered a cholera outbreak that provoked 1,600 deaths.

See also 

 Cholera outbreaks and pandemics

References

Further reading 
 

19th-century health disasters
19th-century epidemics
19th century in India
20th-century health disasters
20th-century epidemics
20th century in India
Cholera pandemics
Epidemics in India
1899 disease outbreaks
1900s disease outbreaks
1910s disease outbreaks
1920s disease outbreaks
19th century in Nepal
20th century in Nepal